Luboń  is a town in Poland, situated on the Warta River, in the Poznań metropolitan area, in the Poznań County in the Greater Poland Voivodeship. It has 29,301 inhabitants (2010). The town was created in 1954 by the merger of 3 long established villages; (Old) Luboń, Żabikowo and Lasek.

History
The oldest known mention of Luboń dates back to 1316, while Żabikowo was mentioned in 1283, and Lasek was founded in 1756. All three villages were part of the Greater Poland Province of the Polish Crown until the 1793 Second Partition of Poland, when they were annexed by Prussia. Regained by the Poles in 1807, Luboń was included in the short-lived Duchy of Warsaw, and in 1815 it was re-annexed by Prussia.

Since 1856 a railway line connecting Poznań with Wrocław ran through present-day Luboń. In 1870, a College of Agriculture (Wyższa Szkoła Rolnicza) was established in Żabikowo, as a Polish college, and was forced to close in 1876 as a result of Anti-Polish policies of the German authorities. From 1871 part of Germany, the Germans located new factories in Luboń and initiated German colonization after 1905 in order to change its ethnic composition. After World War I Poland regained independence in 1918 and Luboń was reintegrated with Poland.

During World War II Luboń was occupied by Germany from 1939 to 1945. The Germans established a forced labour camp for Jews in Żabikowo (called Poggenburg by the Nazis) in the north-west of Luboń. In 1943–1945 Żabikowo was also the site of a Nazi prison camp, which replaced the Fort VII camp in western Poznań, and in which over 20,000 people were imprisoned. The prisoners were mainly members of the Polish resistance movement, but also Luxembourgers, Dutch, Hungarians, Slovaks, Americans, Soviet prisoners of war and deserters from the Wehrmacht. Prisoners were subjected to inhuman living conditions, torture and executions. There is now a museum and a monument entitled Nigdy wojny ("Never War") by Józef Gosławski, as well other monuments to various people imprisoned and murdered in the camp. After the end of German occupation, the area was restored to Poland, although with a Soviet-installed communist regime, which stayed in power until the Fall of Communism in the 1980s.

Luboń was granted town rights in 1954 with Żabikowo and Lasek included within its town limits. From 1975 to 1998, it was administratively located in the Poznań Voivodeship. In August 1980, employees of local factories joined the nationwide anti-communist strikes, which led to the foundation of the Solidarity organization, which played a central role in the end of communist rule in Poland.

Gallery

See also
Bambrzy
Poznań County

References

External links

 
Cities and towns in Greater Poland Voivodeship
Poznań County